The 1971 Giro di Lombardia was the 65th edition of the Giro di Lombardia cycle race and was held on 9 October 1971. The race started in Milan and finished in Como. The race was won by Eddy Merckx of the Molteni team.

General classification

References

Further reading
 

1971
Giro di Lombardia
Giro di Lombardia
1971 Super Prestige Pernod